Walva (वाळवा) Vidhan Sabha seat was one of the constituencies of Maharashtra Legislative Assembly, in India. Walva seat existed until the 2004 elections after which most of the area under it was included in a new constituency named Islampur.

Members of Vidhan Sabha
 1962: (Rajaram-bapu) Rajaram Anant Patil (INC) 
 1967: Rajaram-bapu Patil (INC) 
 1972: Rajaram-bapu Patil (INC) 
 1978: Vilasrao Shinde (INC), defeated Rajaram-bapu Patil (Janata Party) 
 1980: Vishwasrao Patil (Janata Party) 
 1985: Nagnath Nayakvadi (IND) 
 1990: Jayant Rajaram Patil, Indian National Congress 
 1995: Jayant Rajaram Patil, Indian National Congress
 1999: Jayant Rajaram Patil, Nationalist Congress Party
 2004: Jayant Rajaram Patil, Nationalist Congress Party
 After 2008 : Seat does not exist. See : Islampur Assembly constituency

Election Results

1962 Vidhan Sabha Elections
 Rajaram Anant Patil (INC) : 44,345 votes 
 Narayan Dhyanu Patil (PWP) : 15,589

2004 Vidhan Sabha Elections
 Jayant Rajaram Patil (NCP) : 120,830 votes 
 Raghunathdada Patil (STBP) : 35,740

See also
 Islampur Assembly constituency
 List of constituencies of Maharashtra Legislative Assembly

References

Former assembly constituencies of Maharashtra